Seb Davies (born 17 May 1996) is a Welsh rugby union player who plays for Cardiff Rugby as a lock and can also play flanker. He is an ex-Wales under-20 international and full Welsh international.

Davies grew up in the Whitchurch area of Cardiff attending Melin Gruffydd primary school and Glantaf secondary school. Seb played Mini and Juniors rugby at Pentyrch RFC He  proceeded to Coleg y Cymoedd after leaving Glantaf.

Davies made his debut for Cardiff in 2014 having previously played for their academy team, Pontypridd RFC and Cardiff RFC.

International
In May 2017 Davies was selected for the Wales national team summer 2017 tour of Samoa and Tonga, making his test debut in the first test against Tonga.

References

External links 
Cardiff Blues profile
Wales profile
ESPN Scrum Profile

Rugby union players from Cardiff
Welsh rugby union players
Wales international rugby union players
Cardiff Rugby players
Living people
1996 births
Rugby union locks
Rugby union flankers
Rugby union number eights